Walnut Street Ferry refers to the following ferries:
Walnut Street Ferry (Mississippi River) defunct ferry across the Mississippi River from New Orleans, Louisiana to Westwego, Louisiana
Walnut Street Ferry in New York City, established 1817, renamed the Jackson Street Ferry and later the Gouverneur Street Ferry, shut down in 1868